Philenora brunneata is a moth in the subfamily Arctiinae. It was described by Franz Daniel in 1965. It is found in Afghanistan.

References

Moths described in 1965
Lithosiini